Juke-Box Alarm is Stereo Total's third album released in 1998.

Track listing 

"Holiday Inn" - 2.33
"Comicstripteasegirl" - 1.41
"Sweet Charlotte" - 1.31
"Touche-Moi" - 2.23
"Crazy Horse" - 2.57
"Supercool" - 3.34
"Les Minets" - 3.34
"Oh Yeah" - 1.24
"Film D'Horreur" - 1.46
"Vertigo" - 2.02
"Heaven's In The Back Seat Of My Cadillac" - 2.50
"Der Schlüssel" - 2.20
"Nouvelle Vague" - 1.36
"Party Anticonformiste" - 2.12
"Holiday Out" - 2.56
 Untitled - 1.41

References

1998 albums
Stereo Total albums